The 1957 Albanian National Championship was the 20th season of the Albanian National Championship, the top professional league for association football clubs, since its establishment in 1930.

Overview
It was contested by 8 teams, and Partizani won the championship.

League standings

Results

Final 
Played on 3 July 1957 in Tirana.

Relegation/promotion playoff 
The second team of Second Division played in three matches promotion playoffs with the 7th of the National Championship (all in Tirana).

References
Albania - List of final tables (RSSSF)

Kategoria Superiore seasons
1
Albania
Albania